The Battle of Montjuïc took place between 13 and 17 September 1705 during the War of the Spanish Succession.

A Grand Alliance force under the command of Lord Peterborough landed on the Catalan coast in August, intending to capture Barcelona. However, the force first had to take possession of Montjuïc Castle which was commanded by Francisco de Velasco.

Late on the night of the 13th, a force under the command of George Darmstadt approached the castle in three separate columns. One under the command of James Stanhope, acted as a diversion to draw the attention and fire of the defenders, while the other two attacked the rear of the castle. They were initially repulsed, but attacked again and succeeded in taking the outer defences of the castle.

Fighting carried on for several days but on the 17th, the castle finally fell to the Grand Alliance. Peterborough established artillery batteries in the castle, which had a commanding position over the city of Barcelona from which they bombarded it until its surrender a month later during the Siege of Barcelona.

Montjuic
Montjuïc
1705 in military history
Montjuïc